Roquevaire is a commune in the Huveaune valley between Aubagne and Auriol in the Bouches-du-Rhône department in the Provence-Alpes-Côte d'Azur region of Southern France. In 2017, it had a population of 9,003. Its inhabitants are called Roquevairois and Roquevairoises.

Geography
The villages of Lascours, Pont-de-l'Étoile and Pont-de-Joux are located within the commune of Roquevaire. In 2023, Roquevaire will be served by two stations of the Aubagne tramway when the northern Line T extension opens.

Tourism
The main attraction is the organ in the Saint Vincent Church, which is the largest organ in France. The town features an international organ festival in September.

Population

See also
Communes of the Bouches-du-Rhône department

References

Communes of Bouches-du-Rhône
Bouches-du-Rhône communes articles needing translation from French Wikipedia